The 2006 Women's Hockey Intercontinental Cup was the seventh edition of the women's field hockey tournament. The event was held from 25 April–6 May, in Rome, Italy.

England won the tournament for the second time after defeating South Korea 2–1 in the final. Japan finished in third place, defeating the United States 4–1.

The tournament served as a qualifier for the 2006 FIH World Cup in Madrid, with the top five teams qualifying automatically.

Qualification
Except for Africa, all other four confederations received quotas for teams to participate allocated by the International Hockey Federation based upon the FIH World Rankings. Those teams participated at their respective continental championships but could not qualify through it, and they received the chance to qualify through this tournament based on the final ranking at each competition.

Squads
Below is the list of participating squads.

Head Coach: Adil Pashayev

Head Coach: Kim Chang-Back

Head Coach: Danny Kerry

Head Coach: Steve Colledge

Head Coach: Riet Kuper

Head Coach: Franco Nicola

Head Coach: John Sheahan

Head Coach: Ian Rutledge

Head Coach: Lesley Hobley

Head Coach: Huh Sang-Young

Head Coach: Tetyana Zhuk

Head Coach: Lee Bodimeade

Umpires
Below are the 14 umpires appointed by the International Hockey Federation:

Julie Beamish (IRL)
Caroline Brunekreef (NED)
Peri Buckley (AUS)
Marelize de Klerk (RSA)
Carolina de la Fuente (ARG)
Jean Duncan (SCO)
Belén González (ESP)
Soledad Iparraguirre (ARG)
Kang Hyun-young (KOR)
Miao Lin (CHN)
Lisette Klassen (NED)
Petra Muller (GER)
Lisa Roach (AUS)
Kazuko Yasueda (JPN)

Results
All times are Central European Summer Time (UTC+02:00)

Preliminary round

Pool A

Pool B

Classification round

Ninth to twelfth place classification

Crossover

Eleventh and twelfth place

Ninth and tenth place

Fifth to eighth place classification

Crossover

Seventh and eighth place

Fifth and sixth place

First to fourth place classification

Semi-finals

Third and fourth place

Final

Awards

Final standings

Goalscorers

References

External links
Official website

Women's Intercontinental Cup
Intercontinental Cup
Intercontinental Cup
International women's field hockey competitions hosted by Italy
Intercontinental Cup
Intercontinental Cup
Sports competitions in Rome
2000s in Rome